Wesley Jones may refer to:
 Wesley Livsey Jones, United States senator and congressman from the state of Washington
 Wesley N. Jones, American politician in North Carolina
 Wes Jones, American architect, educator and author